Arne Bakker (18 February 1930 – 9 October 2009) was a Norwegian footballer and bandy player.

Football career
He was born in Bærum. He started his career in Fossum IF, joined Stabæk IF in 1946 and Asker SK in 1949. Here he played at the highest level of Norwegian football. His team became runner-up in the Norwegian Football Cup of 1951. He played 54 matches for national football team of Norway.

Other sports
Bakker represented Stabæk IF in the bandy sport. The team became Norwegian champions in 1952, 1953 and 1955, and Bakker represented Norway 20 times. In 1952 he took part in the Olympic Bandy tournament. He also played ice hockey for Stabæk IF and Jar IL, and also practiced ski jumping and track and field. In 1961 he received Egeberg's Honorary Award for achievement in multiple sports. He is the only combined footballer/bandy player to date to receive the award. In 1997, he became an honorary member of Stabæk.

Later career
Bakker coached Asker's football team in 1962 and 1963, and later Stabæk. His professional life was spent working for Norsk Hydro. He died in Bærum in October 2009, having lived at Jar his whole life.

References

External links 
 

1930 births
2009 deaths
Sportspeople from Bærum
Association football defenders
Norwegian footballers
Norwegian football managers
Norwegian bandy players
Norwegian ice hockey players
Norway international footballers
Stabæk Fotball players
Asker Fotball players
Stabæk Fotball managers
Winter Olympics competitors for Norway
Bandy players at the 1952 Winter Olympics
Medalists at the 1952 Winter Olympics